Santa Margarida da Serra is a former civil parish in the municipality of Grândola, Portugal. In 2013, the parish merged into the new parish Grândola e Santa Margarida da Serra. It covers an area of 52.38 km2 and had a population of 243 as of 2001.

References

Freguesias of Grândola
Former parishes of Portugal